Josef Waitzer (1 May 1884 – 28 March 1966) was a German track and field athlete who competed in the 1912 Summer Olympics. He placed 19th in the javelin throw and 16th in the discus throw, and failed to finish the pentathlon event.

Biography
He was born on 1 May 1884. After retiring from competitions Waitzer worked as athletics coach and functionary. He headed the Bavarian Athletics Federation in 1948–1950 and 1951–1953. He died on 28 March 1966.

References

1884 births
1966 deaths
German male javelin throwers
German male discus throwers
German decathletes
Olympic athletes of Germany
Athletes (track and field) at the 1912 Summer Olympics
Sportspeople from Munich